Elkton is a city in Marshall Township, Mower County, Minnesota, United States. The population was 141 at the 2010 census.

Geography

Demographics

2010 census
As of the census of 2010, there were 141 people, 58 households, and 40 families living in the city. The racial makeup of the city was 93.6% White, 0.7% Pacific Islander, 1.4% from other races, and 4.3% from two or more races. Hispanic or Latino of any race were 1.4% of the population.

There were 58 households, of which 32.8% had children under the age of 18 living with them, 51.7% were married couples living together, 15.5% had a female householder with no husband present, 1.7% had a male householder with no wife present, and 31.0% were non-families. 27.6% of all households were made up of individuals, and 12% had someone living alone who was 65 years of age or older. The average household size was 2.43 and the average family size was 3.00.

The median age in the city was 40.8 years. 29.8% of residents were under the age of 18; 5.6% were between the ages of 18 and 24; 22% were from 25 to 44; 28.4% were from 45 to 64; and 14.2% were 65 years of age or older. The gender makeup of the city was 47.5% male and 52.5% female.

2000 census
As of the census of 2000, there were 149 people, 52 households, and 37 families living in the city. The racial makeup of the city was 99.33% White, and 0.67% from two or more races. Hispanic or Latino of any race were 4.03% of the population.

There were 52 households, out of which 40.4% had children under the age of 18 living with them, 63.5% were married couples living together, 1.9% had a female householder with no husband present, and 28.8% were non-families. 26.9% of all households were made up of individuals, and 15.4% had someone living alone who was 65 years of age or older. The average household size was 2.87 and the average family size was 3.54.

In the city, the population was spread out, with 35.6% under the age of 18, 6.0% from 18 to 24, 24.8% from 25 to 44, 22.1% from 45 to 64, and 11.4% who were 65 years of age or older. The median age was 30 years. For every 100 females, there were 112.9 males. For every 100 females age 18 and over, there were 104.3 males.

The median income for a household in the city was $32,813, and the median income for a family was $43,125. Males had a median income of $26,875 versus $29,688 for females. The per capita income for the city was $14,950. There were 2.9% of families and 5.8% of the population living below the poverty line, including 10.4% of under eighteens and none of those over 64.

History
Elkton was platted on January 25, 1887, by W.E. Richardson and Frank A. Day. It was incorporated on January 2, 1906. On January 30, 1906, the people of the township elected a president of the council, three councilmen, a recorder, a treasurer, two justices of the peace, two constables and an assessor. A sidewalk was constructed on Main Street in 1908, electricity was brought in the late 1920s, and the water system was built in 1946. Curbs, gutters and new streets were added in 1965.

Notable person
Alvin Baldus, Wisconsin politician

References

Further reading

Cities in Minnesota
Cities in Mower County, Minnesota